The 1992–93 Hellenic Football League season was the 40th in the history of the Hellenic Football League, a football competition in England.

Premier Division

The Premier Division featured 16 clubs which competed in the division last season, along with two new clubs, promoted from Division One:
Wantage Town
Wollen Sports

Also, Swindon Athletic merged with Division One club Supermarine to create Swindon Supermarine.

League table

Division One

Division One featured 14 clubs which competed in the division last season, along with two new clubs, relegated from the Premier Division:
Bishop's Cleeve
Carterton Town

League table

References

External links
 Hellenic Football League

1992-93
8